Zhang Yishan (born 5 May 1992) is a prominent Chinese actor and former child star.

Zhang is noted for his roles as Liu Xing in the family sitcom Home with Kids (2004), and as the protagonist in the crime thriller Yu Zui (2016).

Early life and education
Zhang was born and raised in Xicheng District, Beijing. When he was 5, his father sent him to Shichahai Martial Arts School to study Kung Fu. Through a teacher's recommendation, he was sent to a Speech Studio for children to study. There, he was noticed by a director who cast him in his first television project.

Zhang enrolled in Beijing Film Academy in 2011, majoring in acting. He graduated in 2014.

Career
Zhang began his career by appearing in small role in Little Soldier Zhang Ga at the age of 9. Under the recommendation of his co-star Li Yingqi, Zhang went to audition for a role in Home with Kids, and successfully earned the role of Liu Xing. The large-scaled sitcom hit national TV screens in 2004, and ran for four seasons till 2007. Zhang deeply impressed the Chinese audience with his portrayal of a naughty but witty trouble-maker, and became a highly-popular child star in China.

Zhang, with his facial features that resemble those of well-established Chinese actors Jiang Wen and Xia Yu, became a favorite with Chinese directors. He has played in some twenty Chinese films and TV series, including the 2009 production Looking for Jackie starring veteran actor Jackie Chan, and patriotic tribute The Founding of a Party in 2010. Zhang won the New Performer Award at the Golden Phoenix Awards for his performance in Deng Enming's Childhood (2011).

Zhang gained mainstream popularity in 2016 for playing the titular protagonist in the crime thriller web series Yu Zui, based on Chang Shuxin's popular novel. The series received over 450 million hits when it aired in the online video platform iQiyi, and earned positive reviews from the audience.

In 2017, Zhang starred in the youth romance drama Shall I Compare You to a Spring Day alongside Zhou Dongyu, based on the novel Beijing, Beijing by Feng Teng. The same year, he starred in Seven Faced Man, a remake of the Korean television series Kill Me, Heal Me. In late 2017, he began filming the drama Collision, directed by Guan Hu.

In 2018, Forbes China listed Zhang under their 30 Under 30 Asia 2017 list  which consisted of 30 influential people under 30 years old who have had a substantial effect in their fields.

In 2019, Zhang featured in Chong Er's Preach, in which he played Duke Hui of Jin. It is his first costume drama so far.

Filmography

Film

Television series

Variety show

Discography

Awards and nominations

Forbes China Celebrity 100

References

External links

1992 births
Living people
Male actors from Beijing
Beijing Film Academy alumni
Chinese male child actors
Chinese male film actors
Chinese male television actors
Chinese male voice actors
21st-century Chinese male actors